Weebl may refer to:

 Jonti "Weebl" Picking, a Flash cartoonist
 Weebl (also known as Wobbl), a fictional character in Picking's Weebl and Bob cartoon series

See also 
 Weeble, a line of children's toys